Pichirropulli is a village located in the Chilean Central Valley just at the foothills of the Chilean Coast Range. The village belongs to the Commune of Paillaco.

References

Geography of Los Ríos Region
Populated places in Valdivia Province